An EMD SD40X is a 6-axle experimental diesel-electric locomotive built by General Motors Electro-Motive Division between 1964 and 1965. 9 examples of this locomotive were built for test purposes to test the new 645-series prime mover 16-645E3. After testing, eight were sold to the Union Pacific Railroad and one example to the Gulf, Mobile and Ohio Railroad. This locomotive is an experimental testbed for the production SD40, but built on the shorter SD35 frame.  This locomotive was also known as an SD35X.

The designation SD40X was also given to an experimental version of the SD50, built by EMD on an SD40-2 frame. 4 examples of this SD40X were built in 1979 and were delivered to the Kansas City Southern as KCS 700-703.

External links
 Thompson, J. David. EMD SD35, SD40X (Prototypes) and related models Original Owners

SD40X
C-C locomotives
Experimental locomotives
Diesel-electric locomotives of the United States
Railway locomotives introduced in 1964